OrthoCor Medical, Inc. is a privately owned medical device company based in Arden Hills, Minnesota. Founded in 2007, OrthoCor develops drug-free, noninvasive, mobile medical devices aimed at alleviating pain and reducing edema.

History 
The company initially worked to address the untapped market between analgesics and joint replacement surgery. In 2009, OrthoCor received Class III clearance from the U.S. Food and Drug Administration (FDA) for the Active System.

Product 
In August 2010, the company introduced the OrthoCor Active System, a Class III medical device, following approval from the FDA. The OrthoCor Active System is indicated for adjunctive use in the palliative treatment of post-operative pain and edema in superficial soft tissue.

The product uses a combination of electromagnetic therapy and heat, for temporary relief of minor muscular and joint aches and pains associated with over-exertion, strains, sprains, and arthritis. The PEMF is activated when single-use OrthoPods are inserted into the device.

In February 2016, OrthoCor was acquired by medical device firm Caerus Corp.

Awards 
In 2012, OrthoCor was named the winner of The Minnesota Cup in the BioScience Division, a state-wide competition recognizing entrepreneurial excellence. In November of that same year, the firm also won the Tekne Award for Life Sciences (Small & Growing Company). At the 9th Annual LifeScience Alley Expo event, OrthoCor was a winner of the New Technology Show Case sponsored by Boston Scientific.

References

External links 

Medical technology companies of the United States
2007 establishments in Minnesota